Armando Monteiro may refer to:

 Armando Monteiro (politician) (born 1952), Brazilian politician and lawyer
 Armando Monteiro Filho (1925–2018), Brazilian businessman, engineer, and politician
 Armindo Monteiro (1896–1955), Portuguese professor, businessman, diplomat, and politician